Artemisia spiciformis is a North American species in the sunflower family, with the common name snowfield sagebrush. It grows at high elevations in the mountains, frequently in the vicinity of late-season snow.

Distribution
It is found in the Western United States in California, Oregon, Washington, Idaho, Nevada, Utah, Wyoming, and Colorado.

Description
Artemisia spiciformis is an aromatic shrub up to 80 cm (32 inches) tall. It has several stems and many small flower heads. It can be found on rocky slopes, open meadows, etc.

References

External links
Calflora Database: Artemisia spiciformis (Snowfield sagebrush)
UC Photos gallery: Artemisia spiciformis

spiciformis
Flora of the Northwestern United States
Flora of California
Flora of Nevada
Flora of the Rocky Mountains
Flora of the Sierra Nevada (United States)
Plants described in 1900
Flora without expected TNC conservation status